McDermott Will & Emery is an international law firm with a diversified business practice. The firm is one of the largest-grossing law firms in the United States and globally, and its lawyers represent a wide range of commercial, industrial, and financial enterprises.

History
Chicago lawyers Edward H. McDermott and William M. Emery founded the firm in 1934. They were initially focused as a tax law firm, and a corporate department was established in 1941 when Howard A. Will joined the firm. As the century progressed, the firm added capabilities across the legal spectrum, eventually opening eight more offices. By 1984, the firm had amassed 150 lawyers. Over the ensuing 20 years, the firm grew; in 2004, McDermott numbered over 1,000 lawyers.

Organization 
McDermott has more than 1,177 lawyers across 23 offices in the United States, Europe, and Asia. It has a strategic alliance with MWE China Law Offices in Shanghai, China.

The firm consists of multiple legal entities that are coordinated through service agreements: 

 McDermott Will & Emery LLP – based in Illinois, U.S., with other offices throughout the country and a foreign office in South Korea
 McDermott Will & Emery AARPI – France
 McDermott Will & Emery Belgium LLP – based in Delaware, U.S., with offices in Belgium
 McDermott Will & Emery Rechtsanwälte Steuerberater LLP – based in Delaware, U.S., with offices in Germany
 McDermott Will & Emery Studio Legale Associato – Italy
 McDermott Will & Emery UK LLP – United Kingdom

Recognition and rankings
In 2010, recognized by The Chambers Global Guide for excellence in numerous practice areas; several McDermott lawyers were ranked as leaders in their field.
In 2009, the Human Rights Campaign named McDermott Will & Emery as one of the record numbers of US companies earning the top rating of 100 percent in its annual Corporate Equality Index.
For the third quarter of 2008, McDermott's Mergermarket rankings included the top 20 for the number of US buyouts, the top 10 for the number of US-Midwest region deals, and the top 10 by the value of deals in Swedish M&A. According to Mergerstat, McDermott ranked in the top 20 for US-announced deals and among the top for US middle market advisors and US private equity advisors based on both value and number of deals.
In 2006, The National Law Journal named McDermott one of the top 15 defense litigation law firms in the United States on its annual Defense Hot List. Also in 2006, the firm was named one of the top 10 law firms on BTI Consulting Group's Market Movers list.
In 2005, the firm was named one of the top 10 law firms representing the growing healthcare industry in the United States.

Notable alumni
 Fernando L. Aenlle-Rocha, California state court judge
 Neil Auerbach, co-founder of Hudson Clean Energy Partners
 Steven Baddour, member of the Democratic Party and a former member of the Massachusetts Senate representing the 1st Essex District
 M. Miller Baker, judge of the United States Court of International Trade
 Andrew Batavia, disability rights activist, health policy researcher, author, and associate professor at Florida International University
 Robert J. Cordy, former associate justice of the Massachusetts Supreme Judicial Court
 Lanny Davis, political operative, lawyer, consultant, lobbyist, author, and television commentator
 Eric Hargan, former United States Deputy Secretary of Health and Human Services
 Jerrold Hercenberg, subject-matter expert for the healthcare and health insurance industries
 Lucy Koh, United States district judge of the United States District Court for the Northern District of California
 E. Grey Lewis, former general counsel of the Navy
 Jim Moran,  former U.S. representative for Virginia's 8th congressional district in Northern Virginia
 Anne Pramaggiore, former senior executive vice president and CEO of Exelon Utilities
 Atif Qarni, Democratic politician and Virginia Secretary of Education
 Neil F. Quinter, former member of the Maryland House of Delegates
 Larry Ribstein, law professor and author
 Andrew Sherman, corporate and transactional lawyer and author and senior partner at Seyfarth Shaw
 Bryan Steil, member of the Republican party who serves as the U.S. representative for Wisconsin's 1st congressional district
 Bill Weld, former governor of Massachusetts
 Michael Wilder, American chess grandmaster

Notes

References

External links

Law firms established in 1934
Law firms based in Chicago
1934 establishments in Illinois